John Christopher Walter is an American historian, and professor at University of Washington.

He graduated from University of Maine, with a Ph.D., in 1972.

Awards
 1990 American Book Award

Works
"The Changing Status of the Black Athlete in the 20th Century United States", American Studies online, 1996, City of Liverpool College

 Black Athletes and the Color Line: In Their Own Words, with Malina Iida

References

21st-century American historians
21st-century American male writers
University of Maine alumni
University of Washington faculty
Living people
American Book Award winners
Year of birth missing (living people)
American male non-fiction writers